Maharashtra Police (IAST: Mahārāṣṭra Polīs Sēvā, formerly Bombay State Police) is the law enforcement agency responsible for the Indian state of Maharashtra. It is headed by Director General of Police, Rajnish Seth (IPS), and headquartered in Mumbai, Maharashtra.

It is one of the largest police departments in the country, having about 36 district police units in the state. The Maharashtra Police Department has a strength of nearly 1.95 lakh. It also has 15,000 women in its force.

History
During the 17th century (until 1655), the area of present-day Mumbai was under Portuguese control. The Portuguese formed a basic law enforcement structure in this area with the establishment of a Police outpost in 1661.

The origins of the present day Mumbai police can be traced back to a militia organized by Gerald Aungier, the then Governor of Bombay in 1669. This Bhandari Militia was composed of around 500 men and was headquartered at Mahim, Sevree and Sion. In 1672, the judicial overview of police decisions by courts was introduced, although none of the judges had any actual legal training. The situation remained unchanged through the Maratha wars. However, by 1682, policing remained stagnant. There was only one ensign for the whole Bhandari militia, and there were only three sergeants and two corporals.

In 1936, the Sind Province Police was split from the Bombay Province Police. In 1947, it was renamed to Bombay State Police, following India's independence. After the States Reorganisation Act, 1956, the Bombay State Police was divided into Gujarat Police, Mysore Police (later renamed Karnataka Police) and Maharashtra Police.

The Maharashtra Police Headquarters moved into what was known as the Royal Alfred Sailors' Home, in 1896. Construction began on the building in early 1872 and was finished four years later, in 1876. As its name suggests, it was made to accommodate 20 officers and 100 seamen. However, the building was actually conceived to commemorate the visit of the Duke of Edinburgh in 1870. The Duke laid the Foundation stone during his visit.

The Maharashtra government acquired the building in 1928 to house the Bombay Legislative Council. The Police Department subsequently moved in after it was vacated.

Headquarters

The Maharashtra Police Headquarters is in a Grade I listed its heritage building that was built between 1872 and 1876 and designed by Frederick William Stevens (who designed the Victoria Terminus). During the British Raj, it served as the Royal Alfred Sailors' Home, named after Prince Alfred, the second son of Queen Victoria and Prince Albert, who visited Bombay in 1870. The building was used to house sick European sailors. After 1928, it served as the Legislative Assembly and then the Bombay Council Hall until 1982, when the Maharashtra Police moved into the building.

Insignia of Maharashtra Police (State Police)

Gazetted Officers

Non-gazetted officers

Special units

State Intelligence Department
The State Intelligence Department (SID) came into existence in 1905 as the Criminal Investigation Department (CID) and was renamed to its current name in 1981. It is headed by the Commissioner of Intelligence.

Maharashtra State Criminal Investigation Department
Maharashtra State Criminal Investigation Department (CID) is a Crime Branch which was established in 1905 and is headquartered in Pune. It is headed by the Additional Director General of Police.

Anti-Terrorism Squad
The Anti-Terrorism Squad (ATS) unit was created by the Government of Maharashtra in 2004 for countering terrorism. It works in coordination with Central Agencies such as Intelligence Bureau (IB) and Research and Analysis Wing (RAW).

Quick Response Team
The Quick Response Team (QRT) was created to protect the coasts of Maharashtra. Since Mumbai is vulnerable to attacks from terrorists and underworld elements, there was a need for a highly trained, motivated, young, fit and fully equipped team to tackle such groups and to terminate hostage situations. This team responds in the shortest time, moves by fastest means, takes action to collect tactical information and neutralizes the threat. They rescue hostages, render assistance to Central forces and other State forces on Government duty. On the occasion of 30th Maharashtra Road Safety Week, Maharashtra Police launched "Cop for a Day" Program, this new initiative allows any citizen to be a part of the Maharashtra Police Force for 1 Day and be associated with different departments within Maharashtra Police

Anti-Corruption Bureau
Anti Corruption Bureau, Maharashtra is an agency of Government of Maharashtra constituted to investigate offences of bribery and corruption falling within the purview of Prevention of Corruption Act, 1988 in the state of Maharashtra.

Force One
Force One is an elite  counter-terrorism unit of the Maharashtra Police. It guards the Mumbai Metropolitan Region, which is one of the largest metropolitan areas in the world. It was formed by Government of Maharashtra on the lines of  National Security Guard (NSG) as a response to the 2008 Mumbai attacks and was commissioned two days before its first anniversary. 

A list of the  Indian Police Service (IPS) and State Police Service (SPS) officers of Force One is given below:

Highway Traffic Police
The Highway Traffic Police branch was created in 1993 to monitor operations on Indian roads and highways.

State Reserve Police Force
The State Reserve Police Force (SRPF) was created on 6 March 1948 as a Special Armed Police Force of the State of Maharashtra.

Other Departments
 Training Directorate
 Protection of Civil Rights Cell
 Motor Transport Unit: This was established in 1948 to cater to the needs of mobility of Maharashtra Police.
 State Police Wireless: Established before 1947

Notes

References 

 
State law enforcement agencies of India
Government agencies with year of establishment missing